The Army Cadets football team represented the United States Military Academy in the 1970 NCAA University Division football season. In their fifth year under head coach Tom Cahill, the Cadets compiled a 1–9–1 record and were outscored by their opponents by a combined total of 281 to 151.  In the annual Army–Navy Game, the Cadets were defeated by the Midshipmen by an 11 to 7 score. The Cadets' only victory came in the season opener, a 26 to 0 victory over Holy Cross. 
 
No Army players were selected as first-team players on the 1970 College Football All-America Team.

Schedule

References

Army
Army Black Knights football seasons
Army Cadets football